Limnocoris is a genus of creeping water bugs in the family Naucoridae. There are more than 70 described species in Limnocoris.

Species
These 73 species belong to the genus Limnocoris:

 Limnocoris abbreviatus La Rivers, 1974
 Limnocoris abrasum Nieser, González & Eichelkraut, 1993
 Limnocoris aculabrum La Rivers, 1973
 Limnocoris acutalis La Rivers, 1974
 Limnocoris alcorni La Rivers, 1976
 Limnocoris angulatus Nieser, González & Eichelkraut, 1993
 Limnocoris asper Nieser & López Ruf, 2001
 Limnocoris aymarana Poisson, 1954
 Limnocoris bergrothi Montandon, 1898
 Limnocoris birabeni De Carlo, 1967
 Limnocoris borellii Montandon, 1897
 Limnocoris bouvieri Montandon, 1898
 Limnocoris brailovskyi La Rivers, 1976
 Limnocoris brasiliensis De Carlo, 1941
 Limnocoris brauni De Carlo, 1966
 Limnocoris bruchi De Carlo, 1967
 Limnocoris burmeisteri De Carlo, 1967
 Limnocoris calii Nieser, González & Eichelkraut, 1993
 Limnocoris caraceae Nieser & López Ruf, 2001
 Limnocoris carcharus La Rivers, 1976
 Limnocoris decarloi Nieser & López Ruf, 2001
 Limnocoris distanti Montandon, 1911
 Limnocoris dubiosus Montandon, 1898
 Limnocoris espinolai Nieser & López Ruf, 2001
 Limnocoris exogkoma Manzano et al., 1995
 Limnocoris fittkaui De Carlo, 1967
 Limnocoris gracilis Nieser, González & Eichelkraut, 1993
 Limnocoris hintoni La Rivers, 1970
 Limnocoris horvathi Montandon, 1900
 Limnocoris illiesi De Carlo, 1967
 Limnocoris inornatus Montandon, 1898
 Limnocoris insignis Stål, 1860
 Limnocoris insularis Champion, 1901
 Limnocoris intermedius Nieser & López Ruf, 2001
 Limnocoris lanemeloi Nieser & López Ruf, 2001
 Limnocoris laucki La Rivers, 1970
 Limnocoris lautereri Nieser, Chen & Melo, 2013
 Limnocoris lutzi La Rivers, 1957
 Limnocoris machrisi Nieser & López Ruf, 2001
 Limnocoris maculatus De Carlo, 1951
 Limnocoris malkini La Rivers, 1974
 Limnocoris melloleitaoi De Carlo, 1951
 Limnocoris menkei La Rivers, 1962
 Limnocoris minutus De Carlo, 1951
 Limnocoris moapensis (La Rivers, 1950) (moapa warm springs naucorid)
 Limnocoris nigropunctatus Montandon, 1909
 Limnocoris obscurus Montandon, 1898
 Limnocoris ochraceus Montandon, 1898
 Limnocoris ovatulus Montandon, 1897
 Limnocoris pallescens (Stål, 1861)
 Limnocoris panamensis La Rivers, 1970
 Limnocoris pauper Montandon, 1897
 Limnocoris pectoralis Montandon, 1897
 Limnocoris porphyros Nieser & López Ruf, 2001
 Limnocoris profundus (Say, 1832)
 Limnocoris pulchellus La Rivers, 1974
 Limnocoris pusillus Montandon, 1897
 Limnocoris pygmaeus La Rivers, 1956
 Limnocoris rivalis Melin, 1930
 Limnocoris robustus Roback & Nieser, 1974
Limnocoris rodriguesi Reynoso-Velasco, 2020
 Limnocoris rotundatus De Carlo, 1951
 Limnocoris saphis Nieser & López Ruf, 2001
 Limnocoris signoreti Montandon, 1897
 Limnocoris siolii (De Carlo, 1966)
 Limnocoris solenoides La Rivers, 1970
 Limnocoris stangei La Rivers, 1976
 Limnocoris submontandoni La Rivers, 1974
 Limnocoris subpauper Nieser & López Ruf, 2001
 Limnocoris trilobatus Nieser, González & Eichelkraut, 1993
 Limnocoris virescens Montandon, 1897
 Limnocoris volxemi (Lethierry, 1877)
 Limnocoris woytkowskii La Rivers, 1970

References

Further reading

 
 

Naucoridae
Nepomorpha genera
Articles created by Qbugbot